North Turton is a civil parish in Blackburn with Darwen, Lancashire, England.  Included in the parish are the settlements of Edgworth, Chapeltown, Belmont, Entwistle, Quarlton, Round Barn, Turton Bottoms, and Whittlestone Head.  The parish contains 66 buildings that are recorded in the National Heritage List for England as designated listed buildings.  Of these, one is listed at Grade I, the highest of the three grades, five at Grade II*, the middle grade, and the others are at Grade II, the lowest grade.

Apart from the settlements, the parish is entirely rural, and a high proportion of the listed buildings are farm buildings dating from between the 16th and the 19th century.  The other listed buildings include Turton Tower, initially a tower house and later a museum, other manor houses and country houses, structures associated with these houses, churches, a bridge over Bradshaw Brook, and a public house.  The Blackburn, Darwen and Bolton Railway (later part of the Lancashire and Yorkshire Railway) was built through the parish and, associated with this, are a viaduct crossing the valley of Bradshaw Brook, and two ornamental bridges.  Reservoirs were constructed in the parish and the associated listed buildings are a cottage, a plaque, and a monument.  The other listed buildings are two telephone kiosks, a guidepost, village stocks, and a market cross.

Key

Buildings

References

Citations

Sources

Buildings and structures in Blackburn with Darwen
Lists of listed buildings in Lancashire